Bala Buluk is a district in Farah province, Afghanistan. Its population, which is approximately 95% Pashtun and 5% Tajik, was estimated at 100,429 in December 2004.

2009 US airstrike
In May 2009, an American airstrike in the village of Granai in Bala Buluk District occurred that killed many civilians. American authorities investigated the incident. According to The New York Times, the villagers say that 147 were killed, an independent Afghan human rights group says 117 were killed, but the American authorities are skeptical that even 100 were killed. As with all American airstrikes in Afghanistan at the time, it was intended against the Taliban. However, in this instance villagers say that the Taliban had left by the time the airstrike occurred.

See also

 Granai airstrike

References

External links
 Map of Settlements AIMS, May 2002 

Districts of Farah Province